Horst Koschka (born 8 September 1943 in Altenberg) is a retired East German biathlete. He represented the sports club Sportvereinigung (SV) Dynamo / SG Dynamo Zinnwald.

References 

1943 births
Living people
People from Altenberg, Saxony
German male biathletes
Sportspeople from Saxony
Olympic biathletes of East Germany
Biathletes at the 1968 Winter Olympics
Biathletes at the 1972 Winter Olympics
Olympic bronze medalists for East Germany
Olympic medalists in biathlon
Biathlon World Championships medalists
Medalists at the 1972 Winter Olympics